Kent Gaydos is a former wide receiver in the National Football League (NFL).

Biography
Gaydos was born Kent Bryan Gaydos on September 8, 1949 in South Bend, Indiana.

Career
Gaydos was drafted in the twelfth round of the 1972 NFL Draft by the Oakland Raiders and later player with the Green Bay Packers during the 1975 NFL season. He played at the collegiate level at Florida State University.

See also
List of Green Bay Packers players

References

Green Bay Packers players
American football wide receivers
Florida State University alumni
Florida State Seminoles football players
Players of American football from South Bend, Indiana
1949 births
Living people